Daniel Walden-Mullings (born July 26, 1991) is a Canadian basketball player for Klosterneuburg Dukes of the Austrian Basketball Superliga. He played college basketball for New Mexico State before playing professionally in Germany, China, Finland and Israel.

High school career
Mullings attended Sir Wilfrid Laurier Collegiate Institute in Scarborough, Toronto.

College career
He played college basketball for the New Mexico State Aggies. Mullings was named Western Athletic Conference Player of the Year in 2014.

Professional career
He had begun his professional career with Medi Bayreuth of the German Bundesliga in 2015.

On August 8, 2016, Mullings signed with Kataja in Finland, where he averaged 13.4 points, 7.1 rebounds, 2.9 assists and 2 steals per game in 48 games played during the 2018–19 season.

On August 5, 2019, Mullings signed a one-year deal with Elitzur Yavne of the Israeli National League.

Mullings signed with Limburg United of the Pro Basketball League on June 12, 2020. He averaged 8.3 points and 4.1 rebounds per game. On November 30, 2021, he signed with Klosterneuburg Dukes of the Austrian Basketball Superliga.

References

External links
 New Mexico State profile
 RealGM profile

1991 births
Living people
Basketball players from Toronto
Basketball players at the 2015 Pan American Games
Black Canadian basketball players
Canadian expatriate basketball people in Belgium
Canadian expatriate basketball people in Finland
Canadian expatriate basketball people in Germany
Canadian expatriate basketball people in the United States
Canadian men's basketball players
Elitzur Yavne B.C. players
Kataja BC players
Medi Bayreuth players
New Mexico State Aggies men's basketball players
Pan American Games medalists in basketball
Pan American Games silver medalists for Canada
Shooting guards
Medalists at the 2015 Pan American Games